Antonio Casimir Cartellieri (27 September 1772 – 2 September 1807) was a Polish-Austrian composer, violinist, conductor, and voice teacher. His reputation dissipated after his death, not to be resurrected until the late 20th century. One son was the spa physician Paul Cartellieri. Another, Josef Cartellieri, compiled some largely second-hand biographical notes about the father he scarcely knew.

Life and career
Cartellieri was born in Danzig. His father, Antonio Maria Gaetano Cartellieri, was Italian, and his mother, Elisabeth Böhm, was Latvian of Baltic German origin. Both of his parents were opera singers and he received his earliest musical education from them. When he was 13, his parents divorced, at which time Cartellieri moved with his mother to Berlin. In that city he began studying music composition.

In 1791, at the age of 18, Cartellieri became court composer and music director for Michał Kazimierz Ogiński in Poland. In 1793, he returned to Berlin with his employer where his first opera premiered successfully. He then went with the Count to Vienna, where he continued with further musical studies in music theory and composition under Johann Georg Albrechtsberger and possibly Antonio Salieri.

On 29–30 March 1795, the première of his oratorio Gioas re di Giuda took place in Wiener Burgtheater. (In the interval, Beethoven played his piano concerto which became Beethoven's debut as a composer.) In 1796, Cartellieri was engaged by Prince Joseph Franz Maximilian Lobkowicz (1772–1817) as the Kapellmeister, singing teacher, and violinist, roles he held until his death 11 years later. His other duties at court included directing operas and playing the violin in both concerts of chamber music and symphonic music. He notably performed in the world premières of several works by his friend Beethoven under the composer's baton, including the Eroica Symphony and the Triple Concerto on 23 January 1805. He died in Liebhausen (Libčeves), Bohemia at the age of 34.

Selected works
Symphonies
 Symphony No. 1 in C minor (Vienna, 1795)
 Symphony No. 2 in E♭ major (Vienna, 1795)
 Symphony No. 3 in C major
 Symphony No. 4 in E♭ major
 Three Overtures for grand orchestra

Concertos
Flute Concerto in G major (c. 1792)
Concerto for 2 clarinets & orchestra in B♭ major (Vienna, 1797)
Clarinet Concerto No. 1 in B♭ major
Clarinet Concerto No. 2 in B♭ major
Clarinet Concerto No. 3 in E♭ major
Bassoon Concerto (Vienna, 1795)
Horn Concerto
Concerto for 2 Flutes
Concerto for Oboe & Bassoon No. 1
Concerto for Oboe & Bassoon No. 2
Concerto for Oboe, Horn & Bassoon

Chamber works
Divertimento for winds & strings in E♭ major
Divertimento for winds No 1 in F major (1792) (Octet for Oboes, Clarinets, Horns, Bassoons)
Divertimento for winds No 2 in F major (1792) (Octet for Oboes, Clarinets, Horns, Bassoons)
Divertimento for winds No 3 in F major (1792) (Octet for Oboes, Clarinets, Horns, Bassoons)
Parthia No. 1 in E♭ major, sextet for winds (Clarinets, Horns, Bassoons)
Parthia No. 2 in E♭ major, sextet for winds (Clarinets, Horns, Bassoons)
Parthia No. 3 in E♭ major, sextet for winds (Clarinets, Horns, Bassoons)
Quartet for clarinet & string trio in D major
Quartet for clarinet & string trio No. 1 in D major
Quartet for clarinet & string trio No. 2 in E♭ major
Quartet for clarinet & string trio No. 3 in B♭ major
Quartet for clarinet & string trio No. 4 in E♭ major
Three String Quartets

Choral works
 Kontimar und Zora, Cantata (Berlin, 1792)
 Gioas re di Giuda (Joas, king of Judah), Oratorio (Vienna, 1795)
 Siegesfeier (Vienna, 1797)
 La celebre Nativita del Redentore, Oratorio (Vienna, 1806)
 La purificatione di Maria Virgine, Oratorio (Prague, 1807)

Operas
 Die Geisterbeschwörung (Berlin, 1793)
 Anton (Berlin, 1796)
 Anagarda Regina di Boemia (Vienna, 1799)
 Der Rübezahl (1801)
 Il Secreto (1804)

Liturgical works
 Seven Masses
 Two Motets

Notes

Sources
Antonio Casimir Cartellieri at last.fm

External links
 

1772 births
Musicians from Gdańsk
1807 deaths
Polish composers
Italian Classical-period composers
Austrian opera composers
Male opera composers
Polish people of Italian descent
Polish people of Latvian descent
Austrian classical composers
Polish violinists
Male violinists
Austrian violinists
Pupils of Antonio Salieri
Pupils of Johann Georg Albrechtsberger
Austrian male classical composers
19th-century male musicians
Austrian people of Polish descent
Austrian people of Italian descent
Austrian people of Latvian descent
String quartet composers